"Red Sails in the Sunset" may refer to:
Red Sails in the Sunset (album), a 1984 album by Midnight Oil
"Red Sails in the Sunset" (song), a popular 1935  song recorded by many artists